Nicolas Perera  (born 5 June 1986) is a Spanish-born American soccer coach, executive, and player who plays for the Tacoma Stars of the MASL. He coached the team from 2018 to 2021.

As an executive, Perera was most recently the general manager of OL Reign of the NWSL from 2022 to 2023.

Early life 
Perera was born in Madrid, Spain, to Spanish father Prudencio and American mother Dione; he spent most of his childhood in Belgium. Perera speaks six languages: English, Spanish, French, Dutch, Italian, and Portuguese.

Playing career

Youth and college 

Perera played youth soccer in Belgium with club team K.N.S. Tervuren, as well as his high school team European School of Brussels.  He walked on to the UC Santa Barbara Gauchos men's soccer team in 2005 after receiving a recommendation from his mother.

Perera played an integral role in UC Santa Barbara’s attack, leading the Gauchos to the 2006 NCAA Division I Men's Soccer Championship and winning the national title.  For his performances in the 2006 tournament, he was named the College Cup's Most Outstanding Offensive Player.

Professional 
After finishing college, Perera played a few matches with California-based Bakersfield Brigade of the USL Premier Development League where he was reunited with UC Santa Barbara teammates Tino Nuñez, Greg Curry, Jon Curry, and Andrew Proctor.  Additionally, Eric Wynalda was also on the squad.

Perera then joined Benidorm CF in Spain, before heading back to America to join San Diego Sockers where he played indoor soccer.  Despite appearing in just 6 games, he scored 5 goals for the club.

In the off-season, Perera joined Milwaukee Wave.  Perera racked up 69 appearances, scoring 52 goals, before moving back to San Diego Sockers ahead of their 2014/15 season.  In October 2016, Perera was traded to Ontario Fury. He appeared in 15 games for the Fury and scored 17 goals with 16 assists in his lone season with the club.

Perera was traded in the offseason from Ontario Fury to Syracuse Silver Knights. He appeared 3 times in November 2017 for the Silver Knights and scored 4 goals with two assists. In December 2017, it was announced that Perera was traded to Tacoma Stars.

International 
Perera represented the United States in the 2013 FIFA Beach Soccer World Cup where he led the team in goals scored. Despite the United States not advancing past the group stage, his 5 goals were good for a seventh place finish overall in the tournament.

Coaching career 
In December 2018, Perera became the head coach of Tacoma Stars. He coached the team until 2021 while continuing to play.

Executive career 
Alongside his playing career, Perera is an elected member of the U.S. Soccer Athlete Council.

Perera was named the executive director of Washington Youth Soccer in June 2021.

In February 2022, Perera was named the general manager of OL Reign. He resigned in March 2023.

Honors 
UC Santa Barbara Gauchos
 NCAA Division I Men's Soccer Championship: 2006

United States beach soccer
CONCACAF Beach Soccer Championship: 2013

Individual
 College Cup Most Outstanding Offensive Player: 2006
CONCACAF Beach Soccer Championship top scorer: 2013, 2019

References

External links 
 
 
 MISL player profile
 UC Santa Barbara player profile

1986 births
Living people
Footballers from the Community of Madrid
American soccer players
Association football forwards
UC Santa Barbara Gauchos men's soccer players
San Diego Sockers (PASL) players
Professional Arena Soccer League players
Milwaukee Wave players
Major Indoor Soccer League (2008–2014) players
American beach soccer players
Tacoma Stars (2003–) players
Major Arena Soccer League players
American soccer coaches
Player-coaches
Ontario Fury players
NCAA Division I Men's Soccer Tournament Most Outstanding Player winners
Major Arena Soccer League coaches
American expatriate soccer players
Expatriate footballers in Spain
American expatriate sportspeople in Spain
American expatriate sportspeople in Belgium
Expatriate footballers in Belgium